The 1991 Sunbelt Independent Soccer League was an American soccer season run by the Sunbelt Independent Soccer League.

Regular season
 Regulation win = 6 points
 Shootout win (SW) = 4 points
 Shootout loss (SL) = 2 points
 Bonus Points (BP): 1 point for each goal scored up to 3 per game.

Southeast Conference

Tex-Oma Conference

Southwest Conference

Playoffs
The Memphis Rogues won their first round series against the Atlanta Quicksilver.  Having the best record in the league, the Rogues expected to play New Mexico Chiles in Memphis, but league commissioner Francisco Marcos moved the series to Albuquerque, New Mexico based on the higher number of spectators at Chiles games.  When the Rogues withdrew from the playoffs in protest, Marcos shuffled the teams in the semifinal round.  He replaced the Rogues with the El Paso Patriots which had the best record among the teams eliminated in the first round.

Final

Points leaders

Awards
MVP:  David Pfeil, Richardson Rockets
Leading goal scorer: Vladi Stanojevic, New Mexico 
Leading goalkeepers:  David West and Daniel Gonzalez, Memphis
Coach of the Year:  Phil Jones, Richardson Rockets

References

External links
United Soccer Leagues (RSSSF)
The Year in American Soccer - 1991

USISL outdoor seasons (1989–1994)
2